Acrobatic Dog-Fight (published in Japan as Dog-Fight) is a multidirectional shooter released in arcades by Technos in 1984. The graphics and core gameplay are similar to 1982's more popular Time Pilot from Konami.

Gameplay

In Acrobatic Dog-Fight the playing field is limited with a ceiling and ground as well as an ultimate destination to navigate to. Acrobatic Dog-Fight also adds two buttons, a secondary weapon and an eject button. Eject can be used at any time and makes it possible to hijack enemy planes and continue flying them. If the pilot fails to hijack an enemy plane he would parachute to the ground where a standard plane waits nearby.

External links
 Acrobatic Dog-Fight at Arcade History
 

1984 video games
Arcade video games
Arcade-only video games
Multidirectional shooters
Technōs Japan games
Video games developed in Japan